The mid-term Turkish Parliament Speaker elections of 2013 were held on 2 July 2013 in order to elect the Speaker of the Grand National Assembly. The election took place in three rounds, resulting in the incumbent Speaker Cemil Çiçek being re-elected to continue serving until the end of the 24th Parliament. The election took place half-way through the term of the 24th Parliament, which lasted from June 2011 to June 2015.

Three candidates contested the election, with the Justice and Development Party (AKP) re-nominating Çiçek. The Republican People's Party (CHP) nominated Osman Korutürk while the Nationalist Movement Party (MHP) nominated Faruk Bal. The Peace and Democracy Party (BDP) did not put forward a candidate. Çiçek was elected in the third round, winning 299 votes to Korutürk's and Bal's.

Election process
The Speaker is elected by secret ballot through a maximum of four rounds held within Parliament, with a two-thirds majority of 367 votes to be elected outright in the first two rounds. If the election goes into a third round, the votes needed to win is lowered to a simple majority (276) votes. If the election goes into a fourth round, the top two candidates who won the most votes in the third round contest a run-off, with the candidate winning the highest number of votes being elected.

Candidates

Potential candidates
Before the candidates were announced, it was speculated that Burhan Kuzu could be selected as the AKP's nominee. When the AKP eventually settled for Çiçek, Kuzu released a statement claiming that he was not resentful but very hurt by the decision.

Declared candidates
Cemil Çiçek, incumbent Speaker of the Grand National Assembly and AKP Member of Parliament for Ankara's second electoral district
Osman Korutürk, former Ambassador and CHP Member of Parliament for İstanbul's first electoral district
Faruk Bal, former Minister of State and MHP Member of Parliament for Konya

Results

See also
Deputy Speaker of the Grand National Assembly

References

External links
Speaker of the Grand National Assembly, official website

Speaker elections in Turkey
2013 elections in Turkey